The 2B9 Vasilek (2Б9 "Василёк" - Cornflower) is an automatic 82 mm gun-mortar developed in the Soviet Union in 1967 and fielded with the Soviet Army in 1970. It was based on the F-82 automatic mortar. Unlike conventional mortars, the 2B9 can fire in single and automatic mode using four-round clips. Rounds can be loaded from either the muzzle or the breech. Because of its wheeled carriage, the 2B9 resembles a light artillery piece more than a conventional mortar.

The 2B9 was used in Afghanistan by Soviet units and is still found in Russian airmobile infantry units. In the fighting in Afghanistan, Soviet units found the 2B9 to be a versatile and useful weapon. The 2B9 can fire high-explosive, armor-piercing and smoke shells, as well as flares. The armor-piercing projectile, which weighs 3.1 kg, has a 75 g warhead that can penetrate 100mm of armor. Upon blast, the high-explosive shell produces 400 to 600 fragments.

The 2B9 can be towed but is usually carried on a modified GAZ-66. By 1988, the 2B9 was also deployed as a self-propelled weapon by mounting the gun-mortar in the rear of an MT-LB armored personnel carrier.

During the Syrian Civil War, the 2B9M Vasilek was used by the Syrian Armed Forces, Kurdish People's Protection Units, and the Islamist group Ansar al-Sham. The latter used a 2B9M automatic mortar near Mount Chalma, Kesab district.

Variants
 2B9 Vasilek – Basic model
 2B9M Vasilek – Modernised version introduced in 1982, and adopted in 1983.
 DE-82 - upgraded Hungarian version developed in 1987.
 Type W99 – 2B9 Vasilek produced in the People's Republic of China by Norinco.

Operators

Current operators
 
 
 
 
 
  – As for Saddam's era, often used mounted on MT-LB.
 
 
 
 
  – Used by both government and rebel forces in the Syrian Civil War.
  – Used by both government and Donetsk People's Republic , Luhansk People's Republic forces in the war in Donbas

Former operators
  – Passed down to successor states.

References

External links

 www.janes.com

Cold War artillery of the Soviet Union
Mortars of the Soviet Union
Infantry mortars
82 mm artillery
82 mm mortars
Gun-mortars
Military equipment introduced in the 1970s